The Chinmaya Mission is a Hindu religious and spiritual organization engaged in the dissemination of Vedanta, the science of the self as expounded in the Vedas, particularly the Upanishads, and other Hindu scriptures such as the Bhagavad Gita.  It was formed in 1951. The devotees of the renowned Vedanta teacher Swami Chinmayananda Saraswati from present-day Kerala, India established the Chinmaya Mission in India in 1953.

Administered by the Central Chinmaya Mission Trust in Mumbai, India, the mission was later headed by Swami Tejomayananda and is now headed by Swami Swaroopananda. There are over 313 mission centres all over India and abroad. North America had more than 30 centres. It is currently administered by Central Chinmaya Mission Trust (CCMT) in Mumbai, India, headed by Swami Swaroopananda.

The motto of the Chinmaya Mission is "to give maximum happiness to maximum people for maximum time". It does not seek to convert other religious practitioners.

History

Foundation
Swami Chinmayananda Saraswati, the founder of Chinmaya Mission, was born in the city of Ernakulam in present-day Kerala, India. He taught spirituality as the art of living. Through jnana yoga (the Vedantic path of spiritual knowledge), he emphasized the balance of head and heart, pointing out selfless work, study, and meditation as the cornerstones of spiritual practice.

Doubting the teachings of the sages in the Himalayas, Balakrishna Menon met Swami Sivananda (Divine Life Society), who initially guided him in spiritual studies and then placed him under the tutelage of Swami Tapovanam (Tapovan Maharaj), with whom he pursued spiritual studies for nine years. He eventually came to share this Vedantic knowledge with the masses, in the form of the dynamic teacher known as Swami Chinmayananda.

Swamiji is a teacher of Srimad Bhagavad Gita. He is often credited with the renaissance of spirituality and cultural values in India, and with the spreading of Advaita Vedanta, as expounded by Adi Shankaracharya, throughout the world.

After Chinmayananda
After Chinmayananda passed away in 1993, his disciple Swami Tejomayananda (known as Guruji) became the global head of Chinmaya Mission. Under Tejomayananda, projects such as the Chinmaya International Foundation and the Chinmaya International Residential School were taken up.

In January 2017, Swami Tejomayananda assigned the headship of Chinmaya Mission Worldwide to Sri Swami Swaroopananda.

Activities

The following activities are conducted at mission centers on a weekly basis:

Bala Vihar 
Bala Vihar is a program in which children from age five to eighteen meet on a weekly basis to learn about Hindu culture, customs, and philosophy. Bala Vihar is a program that is conducted throughout the world, not just in India, but also in countries such as the United States, UK, and Australia. Some centers also have a version called Sishu Vihar, which is meant for children aged 2 to 4.

Chinmaya Yuva Kendra 
Chinmaya Yuva Kendra, known as CHYK, is the global youth arm of the Chinmaya Mission. It is meant for youth aged 18–30 and its motto is "Harnessing Youth Potential through Dynamic Spirituality". CHYK conducts many camps and sessions throughout the world. CHYK West is a similar organization that operates in the West (United States, UK, etc.).

Other activities 
 Study groups for adults
 Chinmaya Vanprastha Sansthan for senior citizens (India and UK)

Medical facilities
 Hospital – 1
 Nurses Training Centre – 1
 Diagnostic Centre – 14
 Eye camp in the rural areas – 1
 Adoption of villages for providing social and medical relief – 120
 Senior Citizen Homes – 8
 Income generating schemes for downtrodden women – 1
 Children Welfare Centre – 1
 Goshalas – 4

Educational field
 Chinmaya Vishwavidyapeeth, a liberal University focused on promoting Indian Knowledge Systems, Indian traditions, Indic parampara and interdisciplinary research. They have established three campuses in Pepathy, Pune, and Warriam Road. Widely known for its interdisciplinary research, cultural studies, immersive programs, CVV stands to merge the academic rigour with the traditional Indian parampara.
 Chinmaya College of Arts, Commerce and Science, Tripunithura
 Schools (Regular) – 70
 Chinmaya International Residential School – 1
 Harihar Schools (Free education & vocational training for downtrodden children for self-sufficiency) – 3
 Colleges – 4
 Degree College – 1
 Chinmaya Institute of Higher Learning – 1
 Chinmaya Heritage Centre – 1
 Value based Vision Programme for schools (Regularly conducted in various parts of India)
 Institute of Management – 1
Chinmaya Academy for Civil Services -  https://www.chinmayaias.com

Rural development

Chinmaya Mission undertakes activities of Rural Development via its wing Chinmaya Organisation for Rural Development (CORD)

Environment related

Chinmaya Mission, Sikkim Centre has established CHINMAYA SMRITI VANAM at Bulbuley, Gangtok, Sikkim, India in 1995 and have planted till now more than 10,000 ( ten thousand ) trees sapling most of which have grown now into full trees.

Studies in Indology
Chinmaya International Foundation (CIF), Veliyanad, Ernakulam, Kerala

Cultural field
 Sandeepany Sadhanalaya, Mumbai
Imparting knowledge of Indian scriptures in English and regional languages (Free two years residential course, for college graduate students) – 6
 Seminars on public speaking for Youth
 Leadership and personality development for youth and adults
 Chinmaya Naada Bindu: Gurukul of Indian Performing Arts
 Centre for World Understanding – 1

Areas served
The Chinmaya Mission has influence in whole of India as well as in many foreign communities in Australia, England, New Zealand, Nigeria, South Africa, the United States and other countries.

Ashrams
Sandeepany Sadhanalaya, Mumbai

Chinmaya Tapovan Trust, Sidhbari

Chinmaya Sandeepany, Karnataka

Chinmaya Sandeepany, Kolhapur, Maharashtra

Chinmaya Gardens, Coimbatore

Tapovan Kuti, Uttarkashi

Chinmaya Vibhooti, Kolwan, Pune

Chinmaya Krishnalaya, Piercy, CA, USA

SharadaSannidhi, Mangalore, Karnataka

Sydney, NSW, Australia

Chinmayaranyam, Andhra Pradesh

Chinmaya Mission, Sikkim Centre Ashram at Saramsa, Near Jalipool, near Gangtok, Sikkim, India

Chinmaya Mission at Bhopal, Madhya Pradesh, India

Paramdham Ashram at Ahmedabad, Gujarat

Chinmaya Mission Avantika.  Ann Arbor, MI. USA

Chinmaya Vrindavan. Cranbury, NJ, USA.

CHINMAYA “OMKARA”- NW.INDIANA-USA www.chinmaya-nwindiana.org
8705 Merrillville Road.
Merrillville Indiana-46410 USA

BADRI- YAMUNOTRI- GANGOTRI- 
Chinmaya Mission Chicago
www.mychinmaya.org

Chinmaya Hamsa Vahini -Peoria-USA

Chinmaya Prabha -Houston- USA

Chinmaya Kashi - Los Angeles-USA

See also
 List of Hindu organisations
 Swami Sivananda
 Swami Dayananda

References

External links

 

Religious organizations established in 1953
Hindu organizations
Religious organisations based in India
Hindu new religious movements